Antipterna spathulata is a species of moth in the family Oecophoridae, first described by Alfred Jefferis Turner in 1944 as Ocystola spathulata. The species epithet, spathulata, derives from the Latin, spathulatus ("spoon-shaped").  The male lectotype for Ocystola spathulata was collected at Waroona in Western Australia.

Further reading

References

Oecophorinae
Taxa described in 1944
Taxa named by Alfred Jefferis Turner